Acianthera quadriserrata is a species of orchid plant native to Ecuador .

References 

quadriserrata
Flora of Ecuador